Efe Ajagba (born 22 April 1994) is a Nigerian professional boxer who holds the record for the fastest victory in boxing history after his opponent was disqualified for leaving the ring one second after the opening bell. As an amateur, he won a gold medal at the 2015 African Games and bronze at the 2014 Commonwealth Games.

Early life
Ajagba was born on 22 April 1994 in Ughelli, Delta State, Nigeria. He formerly worked in a bakery.

Amateur career
Ajagba took up the sport of boxing in 2011 after previously playing football for a club in Ughelli since 2005. He was coached by Anthony Konyegwachie.

Ajagba was selected to compete for the Nigerian team at the 2014 Commonwealth Games held in Glasgow. Competing in the super heavyweight division he defeated Junior Fa of Tonga in the round of 16 and Paul Schafer of South Africa in the quarterfinals. He advanced to the semifinals where he was defeated by Joseph Goodall of Australia, meaning Ajagba won a bronze medal.

At the 2015 African Games held in Brazzaville, Republic of the Congo, Ajagba was selected as the Nigerian entrant in the men's super heavyweight event. He won the gold medal, beating Keddy Angnes of the Seychelles by a score 3–0 in the final.

In 2016 he won the gold medal in the super heavyweight event at the African Boxing Olympic Qualification Tournament held in Yaoundé, Cameroon. By doing so Ajagba qualified to represent Nigeria at the 2016 Summer Olympics to be held in Rio de Janeiro, Brazil. In the first round Ajagba beat Ugandan Michael Sekamembe on points, he defeated Tunisian boxer Aymen Trabelsi in the semifinal to secure his qualification, then in the final he beat Mohamed Arjaoui of Morocco. Ajagba was the only Nigerian boxer of the ten who competed to qualify for Rio through the tournament, leading to claims from Nigeria's coach Konyegwachie that judges had been bribed.

Professional career
After compiling a perfect record of 5–0, on 24 August 2018, Ajagba scored the fastest victory in boxing history in a match against Curtis Harper, winning in one second via disqualification after Harper walked out of the ring in protest over a pay dispute.

After improving to 12–0, on 7 March 2020, Ajagba fought Răzvan Cojanu. In a one-sided fight, Ajagba dismantled his opponent round by round, and managed to score knockdowns in both the eighth and ninth rounds. In the ninth, Cojanu took a knee with 2:25 left in the round, and the referee decided to stop the fight.

In his next fight, Ajagba made his Top Rank debut and fought Jonathan Rice on 19 September 2020. The fight ended up being less entertaining than expected, especially because Ajagba was not throwing a lot of punches. He did however, still do enough to hurt Rice and earn a unanimous decision victory. Ajagba secured another victory in his 15th fight, knocking out Brian Howard in the third round on 10 April 2021.

Ajagba faced off against undefeated Frank Sánchez on 9 October 2021 on the undercard of Tyson Fury vs. Deontay Wilder III. Ajagba was knocked down en route to a unanimous decision defeat, with scores of 98–91, 98–91 and 97–92 for Sánchez.

Professional boxing record

References

External links
 Efe Ajagba - Profile, News Archive & Current Rankings at Box.Live

Living people
1994 births
Nigerian male boxers
Boxers at the 2014 Commonwealth Games
Commonwealth Games bronze medallists for Nigeria
Boxers at the 2016 Summer Olympics
Olympic boxers of Nigeria
Commonwealth Games medallists in boxing
African Games gold medalists for Nigeria
African Games medalists in boxing
Sportspeople from Delta State
Competitors at the 2015 African Games
Heavyweight boxers
Medallists at the 2014 Commonwealth Games